Cross Plains is a town in Callahan County, Texas, United States. The population was 982 at the 2010 census. It is part of the Abilene, Texas Metropolitan Statistical Area.

Geography

Cross Plains is located in southeastern Callahan County at  (32.126467, –99.164677). State highways 36 and 206 cross in the southern part of town, with Highway 36 leading northwest  to Abilene and southeast  to Comanche, while Highway 206 leads northeast  to Cisco and southwest  to Coleman.

Demographics

2020 census

As of the 2020 United States census, there were 899 people, 477 households, and 294 families residing in the town.

2000 census
As of the census of 2000, there were 1,068 people, 432 households, and 285 families residing in the town. The population density was 893.1 people per square mile (343.6/km2). There were 554 housing units at an average density of 463.3 per square mile (178.3/km2). The racial makeup of the town was 97.28% White, 0.47% Native American, 1.69% from other races, and 0.56% from two or more races. Hispanic or Latino of any race were 5.34% of the population.

There were 432 households, out of which 28.9% had children under the age of 18 living with them, 50.2% were married couples living together, 10.6% had a female householder with no husband present, and 33.8% were non-families. 32.2% of all households were made up of individuals, and 19.4% had someone living alone who was 65 years of age or older. The average household size was 2.40 and the average family size was 3.03.

In the town, the population was spread out, with 25.1% under the age of 18, 7.3% from 18 to 24, 21.7% from 25 to 44, 22.4% from 45 to 64, and 23.5% who were 65 years of age or older. The median age was 42 years. For every 100 females, there were 84.1 males. For every 100 females age 18 and over, there were 81.0 males.

The median income for a household in the town was $22,235, and the median income for a family was $27,500. Males had a median income of $22,188 versus $17,955 for females. The per capita income for the town was $13,284. About 18.5% of families and 23.3% of the population were below the poverty line, including 33.3% of those under age 18 and 19.0% of those age 65 or over.

History

Cross Plains was once named "Turkey Creek", after the stream that now crosses the town's Treadaway Park. In its early years, Cross Plains had the basic necessities like a store, a cotton gin and gristmill, but little else. Hugh Henry McDermett and J.C. McDermett, early settlers here, petitioned the federal government to establish a post office in Cross Plains. In 1878, the government granted the post office, named "Cross Plains" for the crossings of stagecoach and military roads prior to the Civil War.

The town had one newspaper in 1902 (The Herald), but it soon went out of business. The second paper, The Cross Plains Review, started in 1909 and continues to publish a weekly newspaper every Wednesday. The town moved from the west banks of Turkey Creek to its present site in January 1911, to be closer to the railroad. On January 12, 1911, a train full of prospective land buyers arrived in Cross Plains. Before the day was out, $75,000.00 worth of land had been purchased. Cross Plains was the last stop on the Texas Central Katy Railroad spur from De Leon and Rising Star. The Katy abandoned the spur in the 1940s. An oil boom in 1925 increased the population, and by 1940 it was over 1,200. It has remained hovering around the 1,000 mark for the last 50 years.

Education
The town is served by the Cross Plains Independent School District and is home to the Cross Plains High School Buffaloes.

In 2004, voters passed a $1.1 million bond package for new classrooms and gymnasium for the Cross Plains Independent School District.

While CPISD has had an average enrollment of approximately 455 students in the 1990s-2000s, an average of 358 students have been enrolled each year since 2010.

Robert E. Howard

The pulp fiction author Robert E. Howard, creator of the character Conan the Barbarian among others, lived in Cross Plains from the age of 13 in 1919 until his death in 1936. His former home in Cross Plains is now a museum. Every year, Cross Plains holds the Robert E. Howard Days and a Barbarian Festival on the second weekend of June.

Major highways
  SH 36
  SH 206
  SH 279
  FM 374
  FM 880

2005 wildfire

On December 27, 2005, a grass/range wildfire destroyed 116 homes in and around Cross Plains. On December 29, 2005, the Texas Department of Public Safety listed 85 single family homes, 25 mobile homes and 6 apartment units as being destroyed. An additional 36 homes were damaged. The First United Methodist Church building of Cross Plains was also destroyed. Two people died after being trapped in their houses.

The fire spared the nearly century-old house (now a museum) of Robert E. Howard, author of the Conan the Barbarian books.

Climate
The climate in this area is characterized by hot, humid summers and generally mild to cool winters.  According to the Köppen Climate Classification system, Cross Plains has a humid subtropical climate, abbreviated "Cfa" on climate maps.

References

External links
 City of Cross Plains official website
 CrossPlains.com
 Handbook of Texas
 Barbarian Festival

Towns in Callahan County, Texas
Towns in Texas
Abilene metropolitan area